Laura Friedmann (8 April 1860 – after 1893) was a German operatic coloratura soprano.

Life 
Born in Berlin, Friedmann showed her singing talent at an early age and was trained as an opera singer at the Königliche Hochschule in Berlin from 1874 to 1877. Among others, she was trained in singing by Gustav Engel and Adolf Schulze and in acting by Minona Frieb-Blumauer and Karl Gustav Berndal.

On 30 June 1877, she passed her exams under the supervision of Joseph Joachim and was discharged into professional life. She had her first engagement in Bremen under the direction of Max Pohl. She made her debut as queen in Les Huguenots. She then stayed in Bremen for two years and afterwards she was engaged in Cologne from 1880 to 1882.

To perfect her education, she went to Paris for a year to Pauline Viardot. In Paris, she also met Charles Gounod, Giuseppe Verdi, Ambroise Thomas and Jules Massenet personally.

From 1883 until 1893, she was a member of the Semperoper in Dresden, and she also appeared several times as a concert singer.

She not only sang parts for coloratura soprano, but also dramatic parts. Her repertoire included among others Susanna in The Marriage of Figaro, Donna Anna in Don Giovanni, Rosina in the Barber of Seville, Violetta in Verdi's La traviata, Gilda in Rigoletto and Martha in Friedrich von Flotow's Martha.

Further reading 
 Adolph Kohut: Das Dresdner Hoftheater in der Gegenwart. E. Pierson's Verlag. Dresden & Leipzig 1888, pp. 222 f.

References 

German operatic sopranos
1860 births
Date of death unknown
Singers from Berlin
Berlin University of the Arts alumni
19th-century German women opera singers